The 2014–15 WPI Engineers men's basketball team represented Worcester Polytechnic Institute during the 2014–15 NCAA Division III men's basketball season. They were coached by a 17-year coaching veteran, Chris Bartely. The Engineers played their home games at Harrington Auditorium in Worcester, Massachusetts and were a part of the New England Women's and Men's Athletic Conference.

References

WPI Engineers men's basketball seasons